Dolichopteryx rostrata,  is a species of fish found around Hebrides Islands in the Northeast Atlantic Ocean.

Size

References 

Opisthoproctidae
Fish of the Atlantic Ocean
Taxa named by Atsushi Fukui
Taxa named by Yasuyuki Kitagawa
Fish described in 2006